Unetice may refer to:
 Unetice culture, an archaeological culture of the Central European Bronze Age
 Únětice (Prague-West District), a municipality in the Central Bohemian Region of the Czech Republic, namesake of the culture
 Únětice (Plzeň-South District), a municipality in the Plzeň Region of the Czech Republic